Paulin Dhëmbi (born 9 August 1979 in Korçë) is a former Albanian football player who played for Skënderbeu Korçë, Dinamo Tirana, Partizani Tirana and Vllaznia Shkodër and Besa Kavajë, as well as the Albania national team.

International career
He made his debut for Albania in a January 2002 Bahrain Tournament match against Macedonia and earned a total of 3 caps, scoring no goals. His final international was a March 2002 friendly match against Mexico in San Diego.

Honours

Club
Dinamo Tirana
 Albanian Superliga (1): 2001–02

Besa Kavajë
 Albanian Cup (1): 2009–10

References

External links

1978 births
Living people
Footballers from Korçë
Albanian footballers
Association football midfielders
Albania international footballers
KF Skënderbeu Korçë players
FK Dinamo Tirana players
FK Partizani Tirana players
KF Vllaznia Shkodër players
Besa Kavajë players